Nicolò Bertola (born 23 March 2003) is an Italian professional footballer who plays as a centre-back for  club Aquila Montevarchi, on loan from Spezia.

Early life 
Nicolò Bertola was born in Carrara, the most northern province of Tuscany, where he very soon started to play football, joining the local Scuola Calcio of San Marco Avenza while only aged 3.

Club career 
Bertola joined the Spezia Calcio academy as a 7 years old from his nearby hometown club, growing through the youth ranks of the Serie B club and becoming the captain of the under-17 team during the 2019–20 season, whilst playing his first Primavera games, as the first team achieved his first ever Serie A promotion.

In 2020–21 he also took the captain's armband with Primavera, even earning his first calls to the Serie A team by Vincenzo Italiano.

The following season—under Thiago Motta's new management—he became a regular presence in the pro squad, eventually making his professional debut for Spezia on the 16 December 2021, starting the Coppa Italia 2–0 home loss to Lecce as a centre-back. Bertola was then ranked among's Italy most promising under-19.

On 31 August 2022, Bertola joined Aquila Montevarchi in Serie C on loan.

International career 
First called to the under-19 selection by Carmine Nunziata in August 2021, he made his debut during a 1-0 friendly home win against Albania. He was also selected for a second time by the head coach in February 2022.

Style of play 
A centre-back with a strong physical presence—already measuring 1.93m while still a teenager—good at winning duels, with a great sense of anticipation. Having first played as a regista—a deep-lying playmaker—in his early youth, he is also good with possession, able to build the game from the back.

References

External links

Spezia Calcio profile

2003 births
People from Carrara
Sportspeople from the Province of Massa-Carrara
Footballers from Tuscany
Living people
Italian footballers
Italy youth international footballers
Association football defenders
Spezia Calcio players
Montevarchi Calcio Aquila 1902 players
Serie A players